Plagiomimicus olvello is a species of moth in the family Noctuidae (the owlet moths). It was first described by William Barnes in 1907 and it is found in North America.

The MONA or Hodges number for Plagiomimicus olvello is 9742.

References

Further reading

 
 
 

Amphipyrinae
Articles created by Qbugbot
Moths described in 1907